Humanitas College is a liberal arts college that is part of Kyung Hee University, Seoul, Republic of Korea. Humanitas College offers a group of required courses for all freshmen on the great traditions of philosophy, literature and history, with equal attention to contemporary issues in science, technology and society. The program has a strong emphasis on public service and volunteer work, and the visual and performing arts.

External links
 Humanitas College Website 

Kyung Hee University